Eleven ships of the French Navy have borne the name Aréthuse in honour of the nymph Arethusa:
 Aréthuse (1757), a frigate
 , a frigate
  (1798), a corvette
 , a frigate
 , a frigate
 , a frigate
  (1885), a cruiser
 , an  launched in 1916 and struck in 1927
 , an  launched in 1929 and struck in 1946

Sources and references 
 Les bâtiments ayant porté le nom d'Aréthuse, netmarine.net
 Jean-Michel Roche, Dictionnaire de la flotte française de 1671 à nos jours

French Navy ship names